A Pillar of Salt is the sixth studio album by American folk music artist Noah Gundersen. It was released by Cooking Vinyl America on October 8, 2021.

Background 

A Pillar of Salt was written over a period starting in March 2020 and continuing well into 2021. Gundersen worked with several collaborators on A Pillar of Salt, including producer Andy Park, pianist Dave Dalton, and guest vocalist Phoebe Bridgers. Sonically, the album is a continuation of Gundersen's branching out from the acoustic niche he had established in the first several years of his career. Along with Gundersen's guitar playing the album contains string sections (arranged by Gundersen's sister, Abby), programmed percussion, layered electric guitar, and synthesized keyboards.

Promotion for A Pillar of Salt began on August 30, 2021, when Gundersen posted an image of a breaking wave with the words, "break my heart into a thousand parts"; the line would turn out to be from the third track on the album, "The Coast". Each day he'd post an image with another lyric from one of the album's tracks, culminating in a September 9 post of the Seattle skyline captioned, "every bar in this city reminds me of somebody now". With this post he announced the premier of the album's first single on the KEXP show, The Morning Show with John Richards at 7:00 am PST the following day. He also announced it would appear on the music streaming app Spotify at midnight that night.

When the alluded time came, the single "Sleepless in Seattle" was released to major streaming services. Gundersen performed it on KEXP as promised the following morning. Once the song had been out for a few hours, Gundersen elaborated on its meaning, saying that the track chronicled his moving away from Seattle after twelve years in the city. Along with the rest of A Pillar of Salt, "Sleepless in Seattle" was recorded in the titular city by producer Andy Park.

On September 13, Gundersen announced that the full album would be released on October 8, and provided links to pre-order vinyl LP or CD copies. The following day he announced the album would be performed live in its entirety at St. Marks Cathedral in Seattle on December 4.

On September 29, Gundersen outlined an upcoming 2022 Europe/UK Tour in support of A Pillar of Salt. Beginning in March 2022, Gundersen will tour for two and a half weeks across Europe, starting in Stockholm and finishing in Dublin.

Release

Physical release 
The long single for the album, "Sleepless in Seattle", premiered on streaming services on September 10, 2021. The album released in its entirety on October 8. Physical copies were made available for purchase on Gundersen's online store, and the album is on all major streaming services.

Reception 
A Pillar of Salt received widespread critical acclaim. Sputnik Music said that the album "takes ageless topics such as identity, vices, and faith and makes them both deeply personal and widely universal" in its 4.5/5 star review. Gundersen's lyricism was a common theme across positive reviews. In its 8.0/10 review of the album, The Line of Best Fit remarked: "It's a scrapbook of life and its lessons, considered in retrospect by a veteran writer and musician."

Additionally, upon the release of the album Gundersen was featured on Spotify's Grade A playlist as the cover artist. The playlist, which curates what it describes as 'a quality alternative blend', featured "Atlantis" in its October 8 edition.

Despite not being released as a promotional single, "Atlantis" was a major source of media attention for A Pillar of Salt, largely due to the fame of guest vocalist Phoebe Bridgers. British music outlet NME described the track as "somber" and noted the music video, which was shot entirely on an iPhone. KEXP, one of Seattle's largest public radio stations, called the album "a well-crafted set of brooding folk-pop with an atmospheric sound featuring acoustic and electric guitars, piano, haunting melodies and introspective lyrics."

Craig Manning of Chorus.fm called the album "a goddamn masterpiece". He observed in his review that the album served as an amalgamation of qualities from Gundersen's previous discography: "Everything he did well on each of his previous albums is here somewhere, and it all meshes together into a perfect tapestry. The throwback troubadour of Ledges; the thoughtful intellectual of Carry the Ghost; the architect of all those big, bruising crescendos that drove White Noise; the pop polyglot of Lover."

Themes 
As with some of Gundersen's previous releases, A Pillar of Salt details personal experiences with relationships, growing older, loneliness, religion, and life in the Seattle, WA area.

The title of the album alludes to Genesis 19, in which Lot's wife was transformed into a pillar of salt after looking back to the city of Sodom, which she was leaving. She defied warnings by God's angels not to look back while she and Lot's family fled, and suffered accordingly. Particularly in the Deluxe Edition's "A Pillar of Salt", Gundersen uses this image to compare her faithless disobedience and worldly interests to his own refusal to place faith in divine fiat.

Like much of his music, A Pillar of Salt depicts Gundersen's earnest ambivalence concerning spiritual issues, in spite of the aching consequences and worry this causes himself and his loved ones. "He is unafraid of irreverently subverting biblical wisdom" in order to ask the question, "What will win in the end: the will of a man... or the unseen powers of providential fate?"

Track listing

Personnel 
 Noah Gundersen – vocals, songwriting, piano, guitar
 Jason McGerr – percussion
 Andy Park – production
 Abby Gundersen – strings
 Tyler Carrol – bass guitar
 Harrison Whitford – electric guitar
 Dave Dalton – piano
 Greg Leisz – pedal steel guitar
 Phoebe Bridgers – featured vocals
 Alex Westcoat – percussion
 Caleb Crosby – percussion
 Paul Moak – mixing
 Jordan Butcher – cover art design
 Lauren Segal – cover art photography
 Andy Maier – cover art rendering

References

2021 albums
Noah Gundersen albums